99 Herculis is the Flamsteed designation for a binary star system in the northern constellation of Hercules. It has the Bayer designation b Herculis, while 99 Herculis is the Flamsteed designation. This system has an apparent visual magnitude of 5.1, which, according to the Bortle scale, makes it faintly visible to the naked eye from suburban skies. The system is moving further from the Earth with a heliocentric radial velocity of +1.7 km/s.

The binary nature of this star system was first discovered in 1859 by English astronomer W. R. Dawes. The two stellar components orbit around their common center of mass, or barycenter, with a period of 56.3 years and an eccentricity of 0.766. The semi-major axis of their orbit spans an angle of 1.06 arcseconds, which corresponds to a physical dimension of 16.5 AU. The plane of their orbit is inclined by an angle of about 39° to the line-of-sight from the Earth. Reports of a third component of this system now appear doubtful.

The primary component, 99 Herculis A, is an F-type main sequence star with a stellar classification of F7 V. It has 94% of the Sun's mass and nearly double the luminosity, but has an estimated 10% greater radius. The effective temperature of the star's outer atmosphere is 5,938 K, giving it a white-hued glow. This is a metal-poor star, showing overall abundances of elements—other than hydrogen or helium—equal to 60% of those in the Sun.

The secondary component, 99 Herculis B, is fainter by 3.35 magnitudes compared to the primary. It is a K-type main sequence star with a classification of K4 V. With 46% of the mass of the Sun, it has 74% of the Sun's radius but shines with just 14% of the Sun's luminosity.

Images from the Herschel Space Observatory show that a disk of dusty debris is orbiting the barycenter at an average radius of 120 AU. Oddly, the disk appears to be misaligned with the orbital plane of the binary system. This may be the result of an interaction within another star system some time in the past. Most of the disk emission appears to be caused by icy objects having a diameter of 10 cm or less, with a net mass of about ten times the mass of the Earth.

References

F-type main-sequence stars
K-type main-sequence stars
Binary stars
Circumstellar disks

Hercules (constellation)
Herculis, b
Durchmusterung objects
Herculis, 099
0704
165908
088745
6775